Somalia is an album by the American saxophonist Billy Harper. It was released in 1995 on the Evidence label.

Critical reception 

The Vancouver Sun determined that "whether by design, osmosis or accident, Harper sounds like Coltrane reincarnate." The Globe and Mail concluded that "the performances tend to be rather cumbersome, thanks to the efforts of not one, but two drummers, Newman Baker and Horacee Arnold."

In his review for AllMusic, Scott Yanow stated: "This CD contains some of Billy Harper's finest playing in years".

Track listing 
All compositions by Billy Harper.
 "Somalia" – 13:37
 "Thy Will Be Done" – 21:56
 "Quest" – 12:45
 "Light Within" – 7:59
 "Quest in 3" – 4:15

Personnel 
Billy Harper – tenor saxophone, cowbell, voice
Eddie Henderson – trumpet 
Francesca Tanksley – piano
Louie Spears – bass
Horacee Arnold, Newman Taylor Baker – drums
Madeleine Yayodele Nelson – shekere

References 

1995 albums
Billy Harper albums
Evidence Music albums